Creoda may refer to:

King Creoda of Mercia, Anglo-Saxon Monarch in the 6th century
Creoda of Wessex, Anglo-Saxon royalty in the 6th century